Buckhart is an unincorporated community in Douglas County, Missouri, United States. The townsite is at an elevation of  located on Brush Creek east of Missouri Route 95 on State Route CC. It is south of Drury and northeast of Gentryville.

History
A post office called Buckhart was established in 1884, and remained in operation until 1957. The community was named for the fact a buck was killed near the original town site.

References

Unincorporated communities in Douglas County, Missouri
1884 establishments in Missouri
Unincorporated communities in Missouri